Apozomus gunn is a species of short-tailed whipscorpions of the genus Apozomus  that belong to the family Hubbardiidae of arachnids.

References 

gunn
Animals described in 1992